The Indian River is a river in the Lower Mainland region of British Columbia, Canada. It is in the Pacific Ocean drainage basin, and is a tributary of Indian Arm.

Course
The river begins at Mount Baldwin in Squamish-Lillooet Regional District. It flows south and reaches its mouth at Indian Arm, which flows via Burrard Inlet to the Pacific Ocean. An electric power transmission line to Whistler follows the river valley.

Tributaries
Hixon Creek (left)
Forestry Creek (right)
Brandt Creek (left)
Meslilloet Creek (left)

References

Rivers of the Lower Mainland
Rivers of the Pacific Ranges
New Westminster Land District